Pavel (Bulgarian, Russian,  Serbian and Macedonian: Павел, Czech, Slovene, Romanian: Pavel, Polish: Paweł, Ukrainian: Павло, Pavlo) is a male given name. It is a Slavic cognate of the name Paul (derived from the Greek Pavlos). Pavel may refer to:

People

Given name
Pavel I of Russia (1754–1801), Emperor of Russia
Paweł Adamowicz (1965–2019), Polish politician
Paweł Brożek (born 1983), Polish footballer
Paweł Cibicki (born 1994), Swedish footballer
Paweł Deląg (born 1970), Polish actor
Paweł Fajdek (born 1989), Polish hammer thrower
Paweł Jasienica (1909–1970), Polish historian, journalist, essayist and soldier
Paweł Łukaszewski (born 1968), Polish composer
Paweł Mąciwoda (born 1967), Polish bassist for the German rock band Scorpions
Paweł Mykietyn (born 1971), Polish composer
Pavel Nedvěd (born 1972), Czech footballer 
Paweł Pawlikowski (born 1957), Polish film director
Paweł Edmund Strzelecki (1797–1873), Polish explorer, geologist, environmentalist and philanthropist
Paweł Włodkowic (ca. 1370–1435), Polish scholar, jurist and rector of the Kraków Academy
Paweł Wszołek (born 1992), Polish footballer
Paweł Zagumny (born 1997), Polish volleyball player
Pavel (film director), an Indian Bengali film director

Surname
Ágoston Pável (1886–1946), Hungarian Slovene writer, poet, ethnologist, linguist and historian
Andrei Pavel (born 1974), Romanian tennis coach and former professional tennis player
Claudia Pavel (born 1984), Romanian pop singer and dancer also known as Claudia Cream
Elisabeth Pavel (born 1990), Romanian basketball player
Ernst Pavel, Romanian sprint canoeist who competed in the early 1970s
Harry Pavel (born 1951), German wheelchair curler, 2018 Winter Paralympian
Marcel Pavel (born 1959), Romanian folk singer
Pavel Pavel (born 1957), Czech engineer and experimental archaeologist
Petr Pavel (born 1961), president-elect of Czech Republic, former army general
Szarlota Pawel (1950–2018), Polish comic book artist

Fictional characters
Pavel Korchagin, in How the Steel Was Tempered
Pavel Chekov, in Star Trek
Doctor Leonid Pavel, in The Dark Knight Rises
Pavel Fyodorovich Smerdyakov, in The Brothers Karamazov
Fra Pavel, in His Dark Materials
Pavel, in The Boy in the Striped Pyjamas
Pavel Morozov, in Metro: Last Light
Pavel, in Grand Theft Auto Online
Pavel, in Epic Seven
Pavel Vlasov in The Mother

See also
 Paval (disambiguation)
 Pavol
 Pavao (given name)
 Pavle

References

Bulgarian masculine given names
Czech masculine given names
Russian masculine given names
Macedonian masculine given names
Romanian masculine given names
Romanian-language surnames